Pomacentrus tripunctatus (three-spot damsel) is a small solitary damselfish. It is found in reef habitats ranging from the Indian Ocean to Melanesia.

References

External links
 

tripunctatus
Fish described in 1830
Taxa named by Georges Cuvier